Karl Thiersch, also spelled Carl Thiersch (20 April 1822 – 28 April 1895), was a German surgeon born in Munich. His father was educationist Friedrich Thiersch, his father-in-law was renowned chemist Justus von Liebig. One brother, Ludwig, was an influential painter, while another, Heinrich Wilhelm Josias, was a theologian.

He received his doctorate from the University of Munich in 1843, where from 1848 to 1854 he served as prosector of pathological anatomy. Afterwards he became a professor of surgery at the Universities of Erlangen (from 1854) and Leipzig (from 1867). He was a medical surgeon in the First War of Schleswig under Louis Stromeyer (1804–1876), and a medical consultant during the Franco-Prussian War.

In 1865 Thiersch demonstrated the epithelial origin of carcinoma, which put him in opposition to the doctrine of Rudolf Virchow in that a carcinoma could originate from connective tissue. Thiersch's findings were thus agreed upon by research done by Wilhelm von Waldeyer-Hartz (1836–1921) at the University of Breslau. He is also credited with modifying Joseph Lister's technique of antiseptic sterilization by substituting salicylic acid for carbolic acid. In addition, he made contributions involving wound healing treatment and in research of phosphorus necrosis of the jaw.

His name is associated with "Thiersch's graft", a method of split-skin grafting that he developed. This graft is sometimes referred to as an Ollier–Thiersch graft (named with French surgeon Louis Léopold Ollier).

Selected publications 
 Infectionsversuche an Thieren mit dem Inhalte des Choleradarmes Munich, 1856. (won a prize from the French Academy in 1867)
 De maxillarum necrosi phosphorica; Leipzig, 1867.
 Der Epithelialkrebs, namentlich der Haut. Eine anatomisch-klinische Untersuchung (with atlas), Leipzig, 1865 
 Klinische Ergebnisse der Lister'schem Wundbehandlung und über den Ersatz der Carbolsäure durch Salicylsäure In: Richard von Volkmann's Sammlung klinischer Vorträge, Leipzig, nos. 84, 85.

References
 "Karl Thiersch" at Who Named It
 The Medical News (1895) (Biography of Karl Thiersch)

1822 births
1895 deaths
Physicians from Munich
German surgeons
Academic staff of the University of Erlangen-Nuremberg
Academic staff of Leipzig University